Bonjour paresse (Hello Laziness) is the title of an international bestseller by Corinne Maier, a French writer, psychoanalyst, and economist. The book is a highly cynical and humorous critique of work and contemporary French corporate culture (epitomized for Maier by the middle manager) that advocates various ways of undermining the system. Maier advocates that it is in the reader's best interest to work as little as possible. The title is a reference to Françoise Sagan's novel Bonjour Tristesse. It is variously subtitled Jumping Off the Corporate Ladder, or Why Hard Work Doesn’t Pay depending on the edition. Because of their similar attitudes towards the workplace, Maier has been frequently compared to Dilbert creator Scott Adams.

Maier was subjected to a disciplinary hearing on 17 August 2004 by her employer, Électricité de France, for the writing and publication of Bonjour Paresse. The French newspaper Le Monde ran a front page article about the dispute at the end of July 2004, which did much to publicize the work.

Chapter titles and subheadings
As translated by Sophie Hawkes:

Introduction: Business Is Not Humanistic
Can Disenchantment Solve the Problem of Business?
A New Way of Reading Tea Leaves
Warning: If You Are an Individualist, Walk On By
I. Business Speaks an Incomprehensible No-Man's Language
Hello, Gibberish
Acronyms: A Thicket, a Wilderness, Nay, a Veritable Labyrinth
Foreign Languages: No Pasarán
Platitudes Aplenty
II. The Dice Are Loaded
Money Costs More Than You Think
They Tell You to Succeed
Power Struggles: Watch Your Back
Degrees and Diplomas: Or, How to Make Paper Airplanes
Employment and Employability: Knowing How to Brand and Sell Oneself
The Defeat of the Word
The Planned Obsolescence of the Worker
III. The Biggest Rip-offs
Mobility: Journey to the End of Your Career
Corporate Culture: Culture, My Ass!
Ethics, Schmethics
The Strategy: The Art of Appearing Smarter Than You Are
New Information and Communications Technologies Are the Wave of the Future
IV. The Idiots You Rub Shoulders With
The Average Manager: Presentable and Preferably Male
The Hollow Man(ager)
Culture and the Manager: The Marriage of the Carp and the Hare
Engineers and Salesmen: A Stalemate
The Consultant: It's Always Insulting to Be Taken for a Jerk
The Useless, the Submissive, and the Goof-offs
People You'll Never See
V. Extra, Extra: Big Business is Doomed!
Flexibility is Theft
Two Modes of Discourse, Zero Brains
The Spirit of Capitalism: Where Is It?
Meaninglessness as a Newly Discovered Universal Law
The New Economy: The Latest Flash in the Pan
Globalization: The Worm in the Apple
VI. Why There's No Risk in Disengaging Yourself
Work: No More Professions
No More Authority: Take Advantage of It
No More Work: A Godsend
The Art of Doing Nothing
Conclusion: Begin Your Sabotage Tomorrow
The Ten Commandments Imposed on the Middle Manager
My Ten Counterproposals (see below)

Maier's Ten Counterproposals
Sometimes referred to as the Ten Commandments for the Idle, these counterproposals have been widely reproduced on the Web in a shortened form:

You are a modern-day slave. There is no scope for personal fulfilment. You work for your pay-check at the end of the month, full stop.
It's pointless to try to change the system. Opposing it simply makes it stronger.
What you do is pointless. You can be replaced from one day to the next by any cretin sitting next to you. So work as little as possible and spend time (not too much, if you can help it) cultivating your personal network so that you're untouchable when the next restructuring comes around.
You're not judged on merit, but on whether you look and sound the part. Use much leaden jargon: people will suspect you have an inside track
Never accept a position of responsibility for any reason. You'll only have to work harder for what amounts to peanuts.
Make a beeline for the most useless positions, (research, strategy and business development), where it is impossible to assess your 'contribution to the wealth of the firm'. Avoid 'on the ground' operational roles like the plague.
Once you've found one of these plum jobs, never move. It is only the most exposed who get fired.
Learn to identify kindred spirits who, like you, believe the system is absurd through discreet signs (quirks in clothing, peculiar jokes, warm smiles).
Be nice to people on short-term contracts. They are the only people who do any real work.
Tell yourself that the absurd ideology underpinning this corporate bullshit cannot last for ever. It will go the same way as the dialectical materialism of the communist system. The problem is knowing when...

English translations
Bonjour Paresse has been translated by David Watson (as Hello Laziness) for The Orion Publishing Group Ltd in the United Kingdom, and in the United States by Sophie Hawkes (as Bonjour Laziness) for Random House.

References

Maier, Corinne (2005). Hello Laziness: Why Hard Work Doesn't Pay. Trans. David Watson. London: Orion. .
Maier, Corinne (2005). Bonjour Laziness: Jumping Off the Corporate Ladder. Trans. Sophie Hawkes. New York: Pantheon. .

External links
An interview with Corinne Maier (at FunnyBusiness.com)
The slacker's new bible: Management tips from the executive slow lane (MSNBC article)
Slack to the future (a review from the Observer)
Lazy joke lands author in trouble (BBC article)
A French Employee's Work Celebrates the Sloth Ethic (NY Times article)

2005 non-fiction books
Books about social psychology